Diego Daniel Colotto (born 10 March 1981) is an Argentine retired footballer who played as a central defender.

After starting out at Estudiantes he went on to spend most of his professional career in Spain, with Deportivo and Espanyol.

Club career
Born in Río Cuarto, Córdoba, Colotto started his professional career with Estudiantes de La Plata, making his Primera División debut on 16 February 2001 in a 1–1 draw against Club Atlético Vélez Sarsfield and eventually becoming an automatic first-choice with the La Plata club. In December 2004, Tecos F.C. from Mexico paid US$1,100,000 for his services and, almost three years later, he was signed by another team in the country, Club Atlas, playing nearly 150 competitive matches between the two.

On 30 August 2008, Colotto signed for Deportivo de La Coruña in Spain, for €2.5 million. In his first season in La Liga he backed up Alberto Lopo and Zé Castro but, on 2 October, scored twice against SK Brann in the first round of the UEFA Cup: after the Galicians lost 0–2 in Norway, his brace – after heading home two corner kicks – took the game to extra time and an eventual penalty shootout, where the home team prevailed to reach the group stage.

In the following seasons, Colotto relegated Portuguese Castro to the bench and partnered Lopo at the heart of the back sector, under Miguel Ángel Lotina. In the 2009–10 campaign two of his three league goals came in both matches against CD Tenerife (1–0 away, 3–1 at the Estadio Riazor) as Deportivo finished tenth.

On 22 June 2012, free agent Colotto joined fellow league team RCD Espanyol on a three-year contract. In 2013–14, he equalled a career-best four goals as the Catalans narrowly avoided relegation.

Colotto spent the 2015 season in the Indian Super League, with FC Pune City. In February 2016, at nearly 35, he returned to his country and agreed to a six-month deal at Club Atlético Lanús with the option of further extending it.

Colotto spent the 2016–17 campaign with Quilmes Atlético Club, acting as team captain and eventually suffering relegation to the Primera B Nacional. He was then released on 19 July 2017 alongside six players as the board of directors feared injuries that would imply that the contracts be automatically renewed, only to return the following month and put pen to a paper to a new contract.

International career
Colotto was part of the Argentina under-20 team that competed at the 2001 FIFA World Youth Championship on home soil. He played all the matches and minutes for the eventual winners during the tournament, scoring in the final against Ghana (3–0).

Honours

Club
Deportivo
UEFA Intertoto Cup: 2008
Segunda División: 2011–12

International
Argentina
FIFA U-20 World Cup: 2001

References

External links
 
 Argentine League statistics  
 
 

1981 births
Living people
People from Río Cuarto, Córdoba
Argentine footballers
Association football defenders
Argentine Primera División players
Primera Nacional players
Estudiantes de La Plata footballers
Club Atlético Lanús footballers
Quilmes Atlético Club footballers
Liga MX players
Tecos F.C. footballers
Atlas F.C. footballers
La Liga players
Segunda División players
Deportivo de La Coruña players
RCD Espanyol footballers
Indian Super League players
FC Pune City players
Argentina under-20 international footballers
Argentine expatriate footballers
Expatriate footballers in Mexico
Expatriate footballers in Spain
Expatriate footballers in India
Argentine expatriate sportspeople in Mexico
Argentine expatriate sportspeople in Spain
Argentine expatriate sportspeople in India
Sportspeople from Córdoba Province, Argentina